Ireland participated at the 2017 Summer Universiade, in Taipei, Taiwan.

Competitors

Medals by sport

Medalists

External links
 Country Overview Ireland

Nations at the 2017 Summer Universiade
2017 in Irish sport